Live at Canterbury House – 1967 is a live album by singer-songwriter Joni Mitchell, released on October 30, 2020, by Rhino Records. The album, which is the third overall release and the first live release of the Joni Mitchell Archives, features a three-set recording from the Canterbury House student missionary in Ann Arbor, Michigan, on October 27, 1967. The recordings were released on vinyl and on the box set Joni Mitchell Archives – Vol. 1: The Early Years (1963–1967).

Background and recording
Joni Mitchell Archives – Vol. 1: The Early Years (1963–1967) contains a number of recordings from Mitchell's personal archive, including an expansive, three-set recording captured at Canterbury House, the Episcopal campus ministry in Ann Arbor, Michigan, in 1967. The Canterbury House recording made headlines when it was unearthed with lost Neil Young recordings in 2018 by the Michigan History Project. Young ended up being a consultant during the assemblage of the Archive Collection's inaugural release, having had experience with the release of his own extensive archival series, though the project was ultimately spearheaded by Mitchell and Young's late manager Elliot Roberts, who died during the process of planning the release, and to whom the release is dedicated. Planning for the release continued throughout the COVID-19 pandemic, with in-person meetings between Mitchell and label personnel transitioning to telephone and video calls.

Track listing

Personnel
Credits adapted from Discogs.

Performers
 Joni Mitchell – vocals, guitar

Production and recording
 Joel Bernstein – project assistance
 Allison Boron – project assistance
 Barry Bowman – recording
 David Braun – project assistance
 John Chester – project assistance
 Marcy Gensic – project assistance
 Alan Glenn – project assistance
 Bernie Grundman – mastering; lacquer cutting
 Jamie Howarth – project assistance
 Brian Kehew – project assistance
 Michigan History Society - project consultation
 Joni Mitchell – reissue producer
 Patrick Milligan – reissue producer
 Plangent Processes – magnetic tape transfer and processing
 Jane Tani – project assistance

Design
 Al Blixt – photography
 Barry Bowman – liner notes
 Sheryl Farber – booklet editor
 Lisa Glines – art direction; design
 Doran Tyson – product manager
 Shannon Ward – packaging manager

Charts

References

Joni Mitchell albums
2020 albums
Music of Ann Arbor, Michigan